Ivan Nikolaevich Perestiani (also Ivane, ; ;  — 14 May 1959) was a Georgian/Soviet film director, screenwriter and actor, and People's Artist of the Georgian SSR (1949). He was of Kefalonian Greek descent.

Biography

His first actor's experience was onstage of Taganrog Theatre under name of Ivan Nevedomov in 1886. The first movie roles played by Perestiani were Grif starogo bortsa a.k.a. Griffon of an Old Warrior and Zhizn za zhizn  a.k.a. A Life for a Life in 1916. During Russian Civil War, he wrote scenario for several short films.

In 1920 Ivan Perestiani moved to Tbilisi, becoming one of the founding fathers of Georgian cinematography. In 1921, he staged the first Soviet Georgian historical and revolutionary film Arsen Jorjiashvili a.k.a. The Murder of General Gryaznov, where he also played the role of Vorontsov-Dashkov. The silent black-and-white movie Tsiteli eshmakunebi (Russian title Krasnye dyavolyata (Little Red Devils)) that he staged in 1923 basing on the novel by Pavel Blyakhin is considered as one of his best film director's works.

Perestiani worked for several years at Odessa Cinema Studio, Armenfilm studio, and finally returned to Tbilisi in 1939. For his achievements he was awarded with three orders and the honorary title of People's Artist of the Georgian SSR in 1949. He died in Moscow on 14 May 1959.

Filmography

Director
 Love - Hate - Death (Любовь - Ненависть - Смерть) (1918)
 Eva (1918)
 Word of Honour (Честное слово) (1918)
 Father and Son (Отец и сын) (1919)
 In the Days of Struggle (В дни борьбы) (1920)
 The Murder of General Gryaznov (Arsena Jorjiashvili) (1921)
 The Suram Fortress (Suramis tsikhe, Сурамская крепость) (1922)
 Man Is Enemy (Katsi katsistvis mgelia, Человек человеку волк) (1923)
 Red Imps (Tsiteli eshmakunebi, Красные дьяволята) (1923)
 Three Lives (Sami sitsotskhle, Три жизни) (1924)
 The Case of Tariel Mklavadze (Tariel mklavadzis mkvlelobis saqme, Дело Тариэла Мклавадзе) (1925)
 The Savur Grave (Савур-могила) (1926)
 The Crime of Shirvanskaya (Shirvanskayas danashauli, Преступление княжны Ширванской) (1926)
 The Punishment of Shirvanskaya (Sasdjeli, Наказание княжны Ширванской) (1926)
 Ilan-dili (Иллан Дилли) (1926)
 Nest of Wasps (Krazanas bude, Осиное гнездо) (1927)
 In the Bog (Gaplangva, В трясине) (1928)
 Scandal (1929)
 Zamallu (Замаллу) (1929)
 Light and Shadows (Свет и тени) (1931)
 Anush (Ануш) (1931)
 Idler (Лодырь) (1932)
 Two Friends (Ori megobari) (1937)

Actor
 Akakis akvani(1947) .... Director of Gymnasium
 Davit Guramishvili (1946) .... Minister
 David Bek (1944) .... Nuncio of Pope
 Giorgi Saakadze (1942) .... Russian Ambassador
 Diadi gantiadi (1938) .... General
 Arsena (1937) .... Baron Rozen
 Sev tevi tak (1930) .... General
 Katsi katsistvis mgelia (1923) .... Carter
 Arsena Jorjiashvili (1921) .... Vorontsov-Dashkov
 Khveska (1920) .... Doctor
 Otetz i syn (1919)
 Chestnoe slovo (1918)
 Eva (1918)
 Liubov - nenavist - smert (1918)
 Revolutsioner (1917) .... Granddad, an old revolutionary
 Umirayushchii Lebed a.k.a. The Dying Swan (1917) .... Glinskiy's friend
 Grif starogo bortsa (1916) ... a.k.a. Griffon of an Old Warrior
 Zhizn za zhizn a.k.a. A Life for a Life (1916) .... Zhurov, the merchant
 Chess of Life (1916) .... Baron Kering

Writer
  Porposti (1941)
 Ori megobari (1937)  ... a.k.a. Dva druga (Russian title) ... a.k.a. Two Friends (English title)
 Anush (1931)
 Krazanas bude (1927)
 Sami sitsotskhle (1924)
 Suramis tsikhe (1922)  ... a.k.a. The Suram Fortress (literal English title)
 Arsena Jorjiashvili (1921)
 V dni borbi (1920) ... a.k.a. In the Days of Struggle (English title)
 Chestnoe slovo (1918)
 Revolutsioner (1917)
 Grif starogo bortsa (1916)

References

External links

1870 births
1959 deaths
Burials at Novodevichy Cemetery
Actors from Taganrog
People from Yekaterinoslav Governorate
Film directors from Georgia (country)
Male film actors from Georgia (country)
Male silent film actors from Georgia (country)
Soviet film directors
Soviet male film actors
People's Artists of Georgia
Georgian people of Greek descent
Silent film directors
Soviet male silent film actors
20th-century Russian male actors
19th-century male actors from the Russian Empire
Russian male stage actors
Writers from Taganrog